JUPA Psychology Proficiency Test (心理学検定, Shinri gaku Kentei) is a test designed to measure the takers knowledge of psychology by Japanese Union of Psychological Association.

JUPA Psychology Proficiency Test was first held in 2008.

Content 
The JUPA Psychology Proficiency Test is designed to assess whether you possess the knowledge and skills to perform psychological tasks, which can be acquired through university education.

This test has a total of ten modules, and based on which modules the examinees pass, they can be awarded one of the three grades below based on their performance on the test:

Grade 2: Pass at least three modules (including at least two modules from the category A)
Grade 1: Pass six modules (including four modules from the category A) and get a passing grade.
Upper Grade 1: Pass all ten modules

A total of twenty multiple choice questions will be included in the examination for each module.

Result 
As a result of the test, the examinees receive a Pass/Fail result, with the standard score  (M=50, SD=10).

Subjects 
[Category A]

１．Principle, Research methods, and History．

２．Learning, Cognition, and Perception.

３．Developmental psychology and Educational psychology

４．Social psychology, Feeling and character

５．Clinical psychology

[Category B]

６．Neuropsychology and Psychophysiology

７．Statistics

８．Industrial and Organizational psychology

９．Health psychology and Human Services psychology

10．Criminal psychology and Psychology of delinquency

Fee 
(Individual application)

3 subjects – 6,480 JPY

6 subjects – 8,640 JPY

8 subjects – 10,800 JPY

Merit 
Examinees who pass Grade 2 can be admitted as a member of several professional bodies after passing the Grade 2 examination.

The Japan Association of Applied Psychology
The Japanese Association of Counseling Science
The Japanese Association of Health Psychology

References 

Testing and exams in Japan
Psychology education